White Pebbles is a 1927 American silent Western film directed by Richard Thorpe and starring Hal Taliaferro, Olive Hasbrouck and Walter Maly.

Cast
 Hal Taliaferro as Zip Wallace 
 Olive Hasbrouck as Bess Allison 
 Walter Maly as Sam Harvey 
 Tom Bay as Happy Bill 
 Harry Todd as Tim

References

Bibliography
 James Robert Parish & Michael R. Pitts. Film directors: a guide to their American films. Scarecrow Press, 1974.

External links
 

1927 films
1927 Western (genre) films
1920s English-language films
American black-and-white films
Pathé Exchange films
Films directed by Richard Thorpe
Silent American Western (genre) films
1920s American films